The 181st (2/6th London) Brigade was a formation of the British Army during the First World War. It was assigned to the 60th (2/2nd London) Division and served in the Middle East.

Formation
All battalions of the London Regiment as follows:
2/21st (County of London) Battalion (First Surrey Rifles)
2/22nd (County of London) Battalion (The Queen's)
2/23rd (County of London) Battalion
2/24th (County of London) Battalion (The Queen's)
181st Machine Gun Company
181st Trench Mortar Battery
In June 1918 three battalions (2/21st, 2/23rd and 2/24th) were replaced by
2nd Battalion, 97th Deccan Infantry
130th Baluchis
2nd Battalion, 152nd Punjabis

Commanders

References

Infantry brigades of the British Army in World War I
Military units and formations in London